Thomas Ball Silcock (19 September 1854 – 1 April 1924), was a British Liberal Party politician in the radical tradition.

Background
He was born in Bradford on Avon, Wiltshire to Thomas Ball Silcock and Amelia Milsom. He was educated at Bristol Grammar School. He got a BSc. from London University. He married in 1881, Mary Frances Tarrant of Bath. They had three sons and two daughters.

Career
He worked as an architect and surveyor. He was Mayor of Bath from 1900–01 and again from 1910–11. He was a Justice of the Peace. He was elected Liberal MP for the Wells Division of Somerset at the 1906 General Election, gaining the seat from the Conservatives. He was defeated by the Conservatives at the following General Election in January 1910. He did not stand for parliament again.

Further reading
 Thomas Ball Silcock of Bath: a memoir, by Nathaniel Micklem, published by G. Allen & Unwin, 1924

References

1854 births
1924 deaths
Liberal Party (UK) MPs for English constituencies
UK MPs 1906–1910
Alumni of the University of London
Architects from Wiltshire
People from Bradford-on-Avon
People educated at Bristol Grammar School